Gerrish may refer to:

People
 Benjamin Gerrish (1717–1772), merchant and political figure in Nova Scotia
 Billy Gerrish (1884–1916), English professional footballer
 Howard Gerrish (1910–1988), author and teacher
 Jeffrey Gerrish, American lawyer
 John Gerrish (1910–2010), American composer
 Joseph Gerrish (1709–1774), soldier, merchant, judge and political figure in Nova Scotia
 Louise Gerrish (born 1948), track and field athlete
 Samuel Gerrish  1680s-1741), bookseller and publisher in Boston, Massachusetts
 Sylvia Gerrish (1860–1906), American musical theatre performer
 William Gerrish (1898–1978), British philatelist
 Winfield Scott Gerrish (1849-1882), figure in the lumber industry

Geography
 Gerrish Township, Michigan, a civil township in Michigan
 Gerrish Warehouse, an historic warehouse in Maine

Other
 E.H. Gerrish Canoe Company
 Gerrish's Regiment, an infantry regiment of the Massachusetts line
 Gerrish-Higgins School District, Michigan